The 1992 Boston College Eagles football team represented Boston College in the 1992 NCAA Division I-A football season. The Eagles were led by second-year head coach Tom Coughlin, and played their home games at Alumni Stadium in Chestnut Hill, Massachusetts. They competed as members of the Big East Conference, playing a limited conference schedule in the league's second year of football. Boston College was invited to play in the 1993 Hall of Fame Bowl, where they lost to Tennessee, 23–38.

Schedule

Roster

References

Boston College
Boston College Eagles football seasons
Boston College Eagles football
Boston College Eagles football